Günther Krupkat (5 July 1905, Berlin14 April 1990, Berlin) was a German fiction writer, known as one of the leading science fiction writers of East Germany.

Biography 
Born in Berlin in 1905, Krupkat studied engineering before dropping out for lack of means to support himself. He wrote his first novel, Od, at age 19, having been inspired by Soviet writer Aleksey Nikolayevich Tolstoy's 1923 novel Aelita. Its publication in pre-war Germany was rejected due to the leftist ideas propounded by Krupkat.

Active in the Communist Resistance against the Third Reich, Krupkat fled to Czechoslovakia at the close of the Second World War. He settled in the German Democratic Republic (East Germany) after the Nazis' defeat, writing science fiction stories, screenplays, and novels, first fully devoting himself to a writer's career in the mid-1950s, following a decade of working as an editor.

Krupkat became chairman of the East German Writers Union's Science Fiction Working Group upon its formation in 1972. He was succeeded by Heiner Rank in 1978.

Works

Novels
 1957: Das Schiff der Verlorenen
 1958: Das Gesicht
 1960: Die große Grenze
 1963: Als die Götter starben
 1968: Nabou

Stories
 1956: Gefangene des ewigen Kreises
 1956: Die Unsichtbaren
 1957: Kobalt 60
 1957: Nordlicht über Palmen
 1969: Insel der Angst
 1974: Das Duell
 1975: Bazillus phantastikus
 1975: Der Mann vom Anti

References

Bibliography

 Fritzsche, Sonja. Science Fiction Literature in East Germany. Oxford; New York: Lang, 2006.
 Neumann, Hans-Peter. Die grosse illustrierte Bibliographie der Science Fiction in der DDR. Berlin: Shayol, 2002.
 Steinmüller, Angela and Karlheinz. Vorgriff auf das Lichte Morgen. Passau: Erster Deutscher Fantasy Club, 1995.

1905 births
1990 deaths
Writers from Berlin
Communists in the German Resistance
East German writers
German communists
German science fiction writers
German male screenwriters
German male writers
Film people from Berlin
20th-century German screenwriters